The Harvey Mountain Quarry near Bonners Ferry, Idaho, United States, is a prehistoric stone quarry. As an archeological site it was listed on the National Register of Historic Places in 1978.

It was discovered in 1971 by a mining survey crew and it was studied in 1975 by the University of Idaho.

Argillite can be found in the quarry.  A spear point found near Lake Windemere in British Columbia is made of argillite that may have come from this quarry.

References

External links

Archaeological sites on the National Register of Historic Places in Idaho
Boundary County, Idaho
Quarries in the United States